Renato Tereso Antonio Coronado Corona (October 15, 1948 – April 29, 2016) was a Filipino judge who was the 23rd chief justice of the Philippines from 2010 to 2012. He served as an associate justice after being appointed by President Gloria Macapagal Arroyo on April 9, 2002, and later as Chief Justice on May 12, 2010, upon the retirement of Chief Justice Reynato Puno.

Corona was previously a law professor, private law practitioner and member of the Cabinet under former presidents Fidel V. Ramos and Gloria Macapagal Arroyo before being appointed to the high tribunal.

On July 5, 2011, the Supreme Court, headed by Corona, issued a landmark decision on the Hacienda Luisita case, wherein, under agrarian reform laws, the Court upheld both the distribution of land to the hacienda's farm workers and the revocation of the SDO agreement forged in 1989. Hacienda Luisita is a plantation that was controlled by the then incumbent President Benigno Cojuangco Aquino III's family. The control and ownership of the plantation had been the center of a decades-long legal battle between the farmers and the Cojuangcos. The Central Bank and GSIS had endorsed the loans that allowed Jose Cojuangco to take control of the Hacienda in 1957, on the condition that the Hacienda was to be distributed eventually to the farmers under then President Magsaysay's social justice program. The Cojuangco group was given a ten-year window to distribute the lands to the farmers as stipulated. But the Cojuangco-Aquinos refused to honor their legal obligation to distribute the land.

The Supreme Court also ordered that the date of the "taking" be fixed at November 21, 1989 rather than 2011, as the Aquinos argued, a ruling which cost the Aquinos billions of pesos (in just compensation). The Cojuangco-Aquinos, a very powerful political family, finally "lost" the land that was never theirs.

Allies of President Benigno Aquino III pursued Corona's impeachment. A few months later, on December 12, 2011, the Chief Justice was impeached by the House of Representatives. The impeachment and the Senate's guilty verdict were later described to be part of Aquino's revenge against the Chief Justice for the Supreme Court's Hacienda Luisita decision, a move that critics said was meant to have a "chilling effect" on anyone else who dared to oppose the administration and its allies. The Aquino administration gave the senator-judges between P50 to P100 million (fifty to one hundred million pesos) to convict the Chief Justice. The money used to bribe the congressmen who signed the impeachment complaint and the senator-judges who voted to convict were government funds the Aquino administration had misappropriated under the now-infamous "DAP" (Disbursement Acceleration Program). "The Aquino administration used P6.5 billion from the little-known Disbursement Acceleration Program (DAP) before, during and after the impeachment trial of then Chief Justice Renato Corona to bend Congress to its will, two members of the House of Representatives told the Inquirer." The Supreme Court later ruled that the DAP was unconstitutional. A retired chief justice said that because of the bribery involved, the removal of Chief Justice Corona is null and void.

The Hacienda Luisita Case

The Hacienda Luisita legal battle and final Supreme Court decision spanned almost fifty years. The Cojuangco-Aquinos refused to honor their legal obligation to distribute the land under the social justice program, as per the terms of the loan that allowed them to take over the Hacienda. Using their immense financial and political powers, the Cojuangco-Aquinos tried to wear down the poor farmers with the decades-long legal battle. On January 22, 1987, thousands of farmers marched to Malacañang Palace to demand the distribution of the land. 13 protesting farmers were shot in what is now known as the "Mendiola Massacre." On November 2004, the farmers held a protest against the mass retrenchment of farm workers. The farmers, their children and other protesters/supporters were gunned down, and farmers and activists have blamed the Aquinos for trying to silence them. This was called the "Hacienda Luisita Massacre."

The Fight for Judicial Independence
An attack of the Executive and Legislative branches on the Judicial branch, a co-equal branch of government: The death of the principle of separation of powers
When the House of Representatives impeached the Chief Justice at the behest of former President Benigno Cojuangco Aquino after the Supreme Court's Hacienda Luisita decision, the move was seen as an attack on the judiciary. In fact, there was overwhelming evidence produced later that former President Benigno Aquino threatened and bribed the Legislative branch to collude with him. The Aquino administration gave the senator-judges between P50 to P100 million (fifty to one hundred million pesos) to convict the Chief Justice. The money used to bribe the congressmen who signed the impeachment complaint and the senator-judges who voted to convict were government funds the Aquino administration had misappropriated under the now-infamous "DAP" (Disbursement Acceleration Program). "The Aquino administration used P6.5 billion from the little-known Disbursement Acceleration Program (DAP) before, during and after the impeachment trial of then Chief Justice Renato Corona to bend Congress to its will, two members of the House of Representatives told the Inquirer."

During the Chief Justice's Fight for Judicial Independence, the judiciary and other Filipino patriots rallied to support him. From December through May, supporters of the Chief Justice held daily vigils and non-denominational services. Farmers of Hacienda Luisita, who hailed the Chief Justice as the "Champion of Agrarian Reform," and other supporters camped out with their placards outside the Supreme Court in solidarity with the judiciary as their Chief fought for the integrity and autonomy of the judiciary.

Background 
Renato Tereso Antonio Coronado Corona was born on October 15, 1948, at the Lopez Clinic in Santa Ana, Manila, Philippines. He was the son of Juan M. Corona, a lawyer from Tanauan, Batangas, and Eugenia Ongcapin Coronado of Santa Cruz, Manila. He was married to Cristina Basa Roco. They had three children and six grandchildren.

Education
Corona graduated with gold medal honors from the Ateneo de Manila grade school in 1962 and high school in 1966.

He earned his Bachelor of Arts degree, with honors, also from Ateneo de Manila, in 1970, where he was the editor-in-chief of The GUIDON, the university student newspaper. He finished his Bachelor of Laws at the Ateneo Law School in 1974. He placed 25th out of 1,965 candidates in the bar examination with a grade of 84.6%. After pursuing law studies, he obtained his Master of Business Administration degree at the Ateneo Professional Schools.

In 1981, he was accepted to the Master of Laws program of the Harvard Law School, where he focused on foreign investment policies and the regulation of corporate and financial institutions. He was conferred the degree LL.M. in 1982. He earned his Doctor of Civil Law degree from the University of Santo Tomas, summa cum laude and was the class valedictorian.

As Chief Justice

On May 12, 2010, two days after the 2010 general election and a month before President Gloria Macapagal Arroyo's term expired, Corona was appointed the 23rd Chief Justice of the Supreme Court of the Philippines, succeeding Reynato Puno who had reached the mandatory age of retirement.

His appointment was highly criticized, notably by then presidential candidate Benigno Aquino III and former President Fidel V. Ramos, due to a constitutional prohibition against Arroyo from making appointments two months before the election up to the end of her term. Before being elected president, Aquino said that he will not recognize any chief justice appointment that will be made by the Arroyo administration, and mentioned impeachment as an option to remove him by saying "The legislature has the power of impeachment if they feel there are grounds to impeach an impeachable constitutional body. That is open to any president... Therefore we will have to restudy the matter, study our options. At this point in time Congress has yet to be elected."

However, an earlier Supreme Court decision in Arturo M. De Castro v. Judicial and Bar Council, et al. on March 17, 2010, upheld Arroyo's right as incumbent president to appoint the Chief Justice. Voting 9–1, the high tribunal underscored that the 90-day period for the President to fill the vacancy in the Supreme Court is a special provision to establish a definite mandate for the President as the appointing power and that the election ban on appointments does not extend to the Supreme Court.

Corona abstained from ruling on the case together with Chief Justice Puno and Associate Justice Antonio Carpio while Associate Justices Antonio Eduardo Nachura and Presbitero Velasco, Jr. dismissed the petition as premature. Associate Justice Conchita Carpio-Morales, in her dissenting opinion, stressed that the Court can function effectively during the midnight appointments ban without an appointed Chief Justice.

Senator Miriam Defensor Santiago, a constitutional expert, warned critics of the Corona's appointment to obey the rule of law, saying that the appointment of Corona has already been laid to rest under the doctrine of res judicata, meaning that it can no longer be relitigated in court, because it has already been decided with finality. Further stating that "After the Supreme Court decision in De Castro v. Judicial and Bar Council last March, which settled the issue, any petition is now precluded, on the theory of so-called collateral estoppel," She also commented that "The problem with the critics is that they mistake the law as it is; with the law as it ought to be, according to their layman's interpretation. A line has to be drawn between the rule of law and the dystopian concept of freewheeling ethics,"

Doctoral degree controversy
As part of the well-orchestrated and well-funded attack on the Chief Justice, on December 22, 2011, Marites Dañguilan Vitug of the now defunct and highly discredited online "journalism" site Rappler, which was shut down by a unanimous decision of the Securities and Exchange Commission (SEC) for violating the constitutional provision banning foreign ownership in media ></ref>, published an article alleging that the University of Santo Tomas (UST) "may have broken its rules" in granting Corona a doctorate in civil law and qualifying him for honors. Vitug's allegations were later exposed as part of a large-scale black propaganda campaign against the Chief Justice. Vitug, Rappler, and Maria Ressa, Rappler's CEO, have been discredited since Ressa was convicted of libel, a decision the Court of Appeals upheld, ruling that Ressa "did not offer a scintilla of proof that they verified the imputations of various crimes in the disputed article ... [Rappler] just simply published them as news in their online publication in reckless disregard of whether they are false or not.". The judgement also pointed out that Ressa had deliberately called herself an executive editor, rather than the editor-in-chief, in an attempt to avoid liability.

In a statement, the UST Graduate School denied that it broke its rules to favor Corona. It added that Corona had enrolled in all of the requisite subjects leading to the doctorate, attended his classes, passed them and delivered a "scholarly treatise" for his dissertation in a public lecture. UST said that since it has been declared by the Commission on Higher Education as an "autonomous higher educational institution (HEI)" it thus enjoys an institutional academic freedom to set its standards of quality and excellence and determine to whom it shall confer appropriate degrees. It added that issues about Corona's residency and academic honor received were moot because these come under the institutional academic freedom of the university. UST likewise questioned the objectivity of the article citing that Vitug has had a run-in with Corona and the Supreme Court. Vitug supported Associate Justice Antonio Carpio's bid for the chief justiceship in her articles in Rogue and Newsbreak.

Impeachment

On December 12, 2011, 188 of the 285 members of the House of Representatives signed an impeachment complaint against Corona. As only a vote of one-third of the entire membership of the House, or 95 signatures, were necessary for the impeachment of Corona under the 1987 Constitution, the complaint was sent to the Senate for trial.

Corona was accused of consistently ruling with partiality to former President Arroyo in cases involving her administration and of failing to disclose his statement of assets as required by the Constitution. However he argues that he was not required to disclose US$2.4 million because foreign deposits are guaranteed secrecy under the Philippine's Foreign Currency Deposits Act (Republic Act No. 6426) and that the peso accounts are co-mingled funds. Corona said that the case against him was politically motivated as part of President Benigno Aquino III's persecution of political enemies.

On May 29, 2012, he was found guilty by the Senate of Article II of the Articles of Impeachment filed against him for his failure to disclose to the public his statement of assets, liabilities, and net worth. Twenty out of twenty-three senators voted to convict him. A two-thirds majority, or 16 votes, was necessary to convict and remove Corona from office. Corona responded by declaring that "ugly politics prevailed" and his "conscience is clear." This marked the first time that a high-level Philippine official has been impeached and convicted. Senator Joker Arroyo denounced the verdict, ending his statement with "I cannot imagine removing a Chief Justice on account of a SALN. Today, we are one step from violating the constitution and passing a bill of attainder. No one can stop us if we do not stop ourselves. This is not justice – political or legal. This is certainly not law, for sure it is not the law of the constitution. It is only naked power as it was in 1972. I haven't thought that I would see it again so brazenly performed but for what it is worth, I cast my vote. If not for innocence falsely accused, of offenses yet to exist, and if not for the law and the constitution, that we were privileged to restore under Cory Aquino, then because it is dangerous not to do what is right. When soon we stand before the Lord, I vote to acquit". Senator Pia Cayetano explained her vote by stating that "the failure to declare $2.4 million and some 80 million pesos is not minor."

In his September 25, 2013, privilege speech, Jinggoy Estrada, one of the senators who voted to convict Corona of article two of the articles of impeachment, said that all senators, except Bongbong Marcos, Joker Arroyo and Miriam Defensor-Santiago, received ₱50 million each to remove Corona from office. On January 20, 2014, Senator Bong Revilla revealed that President Aquino spoke with him to convict the Chief Justice.

Post-impeachment
On April 25, 2014, the Department of Justice issued a hold departure order against Corona along with former Ilocos Sur Governor Luis "Chavit" Singson. In June 2016, the Sandiganbayan Third Division dismissed the pending criminal cases of Corona after his death.

Death
Corona died on April 29, 2016, at 1:48 a.m. at The Medical City in Pasig due to complications of a heart attack. He also suffered from kidney disease and diabetes.

Notable opinions
 Islamic Da'Wah Council v. Office of the Executive Secretary (2003) — on right of national government to act as the exclusive authority to issue halal certifications
 Republic v. Sandiganbayan (2003) — on the forfeiture of Swiss assets of the Marcos family
 Francisco v. House of Rep. (2003) - Separate Opinion — on the impeachment resolution against Chief Justice Hilario Davide, Jr.
 Uy v. PHELA Trading (2005) — on constitutional right to counsel
 Taruc v. De la Cruz (2005) — on court jurisdiction over challenges to religious excommunication
 Neypes v. Court of Appeals (2005) — on period for appeal from decisions of trial courts
 Lambino v. COMELEC (2006) - Dissenting Opinion — on People's Initiative as a mode to amend the Constitution

References

External links
 Was Corona Honest?: An Interactive Properties Map of Chief Justice Renato Corona's Asset Declarations on Rappler.com
 Special Coverage of the Corona Trial on Rappler.com
 Justice Renato C. Corona (Official Supreme Court Webpage)
 Corona is next SC chief, www.mb.com.ph 12 May 2010
The Articles of Impeachment against Chief Justice Renato C. Corona
Chief Justice Renato C. Corona's Answer to the Impeachment Complaint
The Corona Impeachment: A Breakdown by The CenSEI Report
After 5 Weeks, 45 Titles, 10 Accounts, and One Small Lady
Corona's Defense Goes on the Offensive
Judging the Chief Justice: A Recapitulation by The CenSEI Report
The Manila Times: Legal conundrums in the impeachment trial

|-

|-

1948 births
2016 deaths
Arroyo administration cabinet members
Associate Justices of the Supreme Court of the Philippines
Ateneo de Manila University alumni
Burials at The Heritage Park
Chief justices of the Supreme Court of the Philippines
Presidential chiefs of staff (Philippines)
Filipino educators
20th-century Filipino lawyers
Harvard Law School alumni
Impeached Filipino officials
Impeached judges removed from office
People from Marikina
People from Santa Ana, Manila
University of Santo Tomas alumni
21st-century Filipino judges